Carla Krizanic (née Odgers; born 26 April 1990) is an Australian international lawn bowler.

Bowls career

World Championships
In 2016, she was part of the fours team with Rebecca Van Asch, Natasha Scott and Kelsey Cottrell who won the gold medal at the 2016 World Outdoor Bowls Championship in Christchurch and a gold medal in the triples with Scott and Van Asch.

Commonwealth Games
She was part of the Australian team for the 2018 Commonwealth Games on the Gold Coast in Queensland where she two more gold medals in the Fours with Cottrell, Scott and Van Asch and the Triples with Scott and Van Asch.

Other major events
Krizanic has won four medals at the Asia Pacific Bowls Championships including two golds. The latest gold medal was at the 2019 Asia Pacific Bowls Championships in the Gold Coast, Queensland. In November 2022, he won the silver medal at the World Singles Champion of Champions in Wellington, New Zealand.

Personal life
Carla married Tristan Krizanic in 2015; she had previously represented Australia as Carla Odgers.

References

1990 births
Living people
Australian female bowls players
Bowls World Champions
Commonwealth Games gold medallists for Australia
Commonwealth Games medallists in lawn bowls
Bowls players at the 2018 Commonwealth Games
21st-century Australian women
Medallists at the 2018 Commonwealth Games